Area codes 305 and 786 are telephone area codes in the North American Numbering Plan (NANP) for all of Miami, Florida, Miami-Dade County, and the part of Monroe County in the Florida Keys in the United States. The mainland portion of Monroe County is served by area code 239.

History

Area code 305 was one of the original North American area codes created in 1947 when it was intended to serve the entire state of Florida. The western part of the peninsula from the Tampa Bay area south, which was serviced mostly by GTE (now part of Frontier Communications), was separated with area code 813 in 1953. As a result of the increase in the state's population, North Florida from the Panhandle to Jacksonville was assigned area code 904 with a permissive dialing period beginning July 6, 1965, and a mandatory dialing period beginning January 1, 1966.

In 1988, the east coast of Florida from Palm Beach County north through Brevard County, as well as the Orlando metropolitan area, was assigned area code 407. In 1995, Broward County was split from 305 and assigned area code 954.  Although this was intended to be a long-term solution, within two years the reconfigured area code 305 was already close to exhaustion due to growth in South Florida, and the increasing popularity of cell phones and pagers. In mitigation, area code 786 was installed as an overlay in 1998.  The overlay numbering plan area originally comprised only Miami-Dade County; the Keys were added in 2008.

The Florida Public Service Commission approved a third area code for the Miami region on February 25, 2022. Area code 645 will be implemented on August 4, 2023, before the anticipated exhaust of central office codes in 305 and 786, which is likely to occur in 2023.

In popular culture
 Recording artist Armando Pérez, better known as Pitbull, was born and raised in Miami, and has nicknamed himself "Mr. 305."
 Spanish singer Enrique Iglesias, who resides in Miami, formerly used "@enrique305" as his account name on Twitter.
 A web-based magazine in Miami is called 305 Magazine.
 Kitchen 305 is a Sunny Isles Beach restaurant inside the Newport Beachside Resort (where MTV held its "Spring Break 2008" party).

See also
 List of Florida area codes
 List of NANP area codes

References

External links

 

Telecommunications-related introductions in 1947
Telecommunications-related introductions in 1998
305
305
1947 establishments in Florida
1998 establishments in Florida